is a Japanese game character designer and manga style artist best known for his work on the A Certain Magical Index series.

Works

Illustration 
A Certain Magical Index
Sprite Spiegel
Maid Deka
Is It Wrong to Try to Pick Up Girls in a Dungeon?: Sword Oratoria
Last Round Arthurs: Scum Arthur and Heretic Merlin
Qualidea Code

Character design 
Hotel ergriffen (2001)
Kokyu Shohu (2002)
Minato Genso (2003)
Yume Miru Kusuri: A Drug That Makes You Dream (2005)
Fire Emblem Heroes (2017)

External links
 rainbow spectrum (Kiyotaka Haimura's website)
 Pixiv profile (Kiyotaka Haimura's artist profile)

1973 births
Living people
Japanese illustrators